Founded in 1918, Jit Sin High School  (Malay: Sekolah Menengah Jenis Kebangsaan Jit Sin) is a co-educational Chinese vernacular secondary school in Bukit Mertajam, Penang.

The school is known nationwide as a top elite school for its excellent academic results in public examinations such as Pentaksiran Tingkatan Tiga (PT3), Penilaian Menengah Rendah (PMR) which was abolished in 2014, Sijil Pelajaran Malaysia (SPM) and Sijil Tinggi Persekolahan Malaysia (STPM) consistently every year.

Developments
Jit Sin High School (JSHS) used to share the same compound with Jit Sin Independent High School at Aston Road. In 1992, Jit Sin High School moved to a purpose-built campus in Taman Sri Rambai. Students attend classes from Form 1 to Form 6, they used to organise them into morning and afternoon sessions. Now, all forms have changed to morning session since the year 2020. Jit Sin High shares the same school anthem with Jit Sin Independent High School as well as its primary school counterparts, SJK(C) Jit Sin (A) & SJK(C) Jit Sin (B).

In 2007, the Harmonica and Choir Club and Environmental Cadets have been disbanded as a uniform body and re-categorised into clubs, following new guidelines set by the Ministry of Education.

The school has seen changes made by the 5th and current principal in order to improve the schooling atmostphere as well as the declining discipline among the students – notably the installation of closed-circuit television (CCTV) surveillance cameras. Stricter regulations has also been enforced by the school disciplinary board.

Wi-Fi is available campus-wide by the IT Department in 2010.

In October 2011, Jit Sin High School was awarded the title of Cluster School of Excellence (Sekolah Kluster Kecemerlangan), and is the first vernacular secondary school in Penang to achieve this premier status.

A new building due north to the original building is opened on 22 June 2019 for Form 5 and Form 6 students. The new building consists of 6 floors with 2 main elevators and 2 smaller elevators.

Principals

References

External links

 School Management System
 Jit Sin High School on SMJK Web Portal

Schools in Penang
Secondary schools in Malaysia
Chinese-language schools in Malaysia